Antonin Bajewski (17 January 1915 – 18 May 1941), born Jan Eugene Bajewski, was a Polish Franciscan friar. He has been declared a martyr by the Catholic Church following his death in Auschwitz Concentration Camp in 1941 and was beatified as one of the 108 Martyrs of World War II by the Polish Pope John-Paul II on 13 June 1999. Their collective feast day is 12 June.

Life
He was born in Vilnius in 1915 to a middle-class family; he was an only child. He became a Franciscan in 1934, taking the name Brother Antonin. He was ordained a priest in 1939 and became vicar to Maximilian Kolbe. He and Kolbe were both arrested by the Germans in 1941 and Antonin was imprisoned. He boosted the other prisoners' morale and gave them his rations, before being deported to Auschwitz Concentration Camp, where he was tortured and contracted typhoid fever, which caused his death 18 May 1941.

References

Bibliography 
  Marek Darul, Błogosławiony ojciec Antonin Bajewski, Wydaw. Duszpasterstwa Rolników, 2001 , 63 pages.

Clergy from Vilnius
Polish Friars Minor
108 Blessed Polish Martyrs
Conventual Friars Minor
20th-century Polish Roman Catholic priests
20th-century Lithuanian Roman Catholic priests
Polish people who died in Auschwitz concentration camp
Deaths from typhoid fever
1915 births
1941 deaths
Infectious disease deaths in Poland